Crambus cyrilellus is a moth in the family Crambidae. It was described by Alexander Barrett Klots in 1942. It is found in North America, where it has been recorded from Arizona, Colorado, New Mexico, Texas and Utah.

The length of the forewings is 9.5–11 mm. The ground colour of the forewings is light, shining orange brown, darkest about the discal, silvery white stripe, much paler and almost whitish along the inner margin. The hindwings are pale brownish, almost white. Adults have been recorded on wing in May and July.

Etymology
The species is named for Mr. Cyril dos Passos.

References

Crambini
Moths described in 1942
Moths of North America